Napoléon-Louis de Talleyrand-Périgord, duc de Valençay, 3rd duc de Talleyrand-Périgord (12 March 1811 – 21 March 1898) was a French aristocrat, soldier and politician.

Early life
He was born at Paris on 12 March 1811, the son of the general Edmond de Talleyrand-Périgord (1787–1872), Duke of Dino and later the 2nd Duke de Talleyrand-Périgord, and of Dorothea of Courland (1793–1862), duchess of Sagan.

His younger brother was Alexandre Edmond (1813–1894), 3rd duc de Dino, marquis de Talleyrand, who married Marie Valentine Joséphine de Sainte-Aldegonde (1820–1891).  His younger sister was Joséphine Pauline de Talleyrand-Périgord (1820–1890) who married Henri de Castellane (1814–1847).

Career
In 1829, he was granted the title Duc de Valençay by Charles X of France.

Like his father, he followed a military career. After leaving the army, he was called to the Chamber of Peers on 19 April 1845, where he voted with the supporters of Louis-Philippe's government.

After the Revolution of 1848 he retired into private life. He was made a knight of the Spanish Order of the Golden Fleece in 1838, and an officer of the Legion of Honour on 30 June 1867, as a member of the jury of the Exposition Universelle. He was further made a knight of the Prussian Order of the Black Eagle on 12 March 1891.

Personal life
Talleyrand married firstly, at Paris on 26 Feb 1829, Anne Louise Charlotte de Montmorency (1810/3-1858), by whom he had two sons and two daughters:

 Caroline Valentine de Talleyrand-Périgord (1830–1913), who married Vicomte Charles Henri d'Etchegoyen (1818–1885) in 1852.
 Charles Guillaume Frédéric Boson de Talleyrand-Périgord, 4th duc de Talleyrand-Périgord (1832-1910), who married Jeanne Seillière (1839-1905), the heiress to Baron de Seilliere, army supply contractor who had enriched himself during the Franco-Prussian War.
 Marie Pauline Yolande de Talleyrand-Périgord (b. 1833)
 Nicolas Raoul Adalbert de Talleyrand-Périgord (1837–1915), Duke of Montmorency, who married Ida Marie Carmen Aguado y Mac Donnel (1847–1880) in 1866.

He married secondly, on 4 April 1861, Rachel Elisabeth Pauline de Castellane (1823–1895), daughter of Boniface, Marshal de Castellane, then Countess Hatzfeldt (widow of Maximilian von Hatzfeldt), by whom he had a third daughter:

 Marie Dorothée Louise Valençay de Talleyrand-Périgord (1862–1948), who married Karl Egon IV, the Prince of Furstenberg (1852–1896) in 1881. She later married Jean de Castellane (1868–1965), also of the House of Castellane, in 1898.

He died at Berlin on 21 March 1898.

References

1811 births
1898 deaths
Louis
Louis
Dukes of Żagań
Members of the Chamber of Peers of the July Monarchy
Knights of the Golden Fleece of Spain
Officiers of the Légion d'honneur